This is a comprehensive list of all Article III and Article IV United States federal judges appointed by President Donald Trump as well as a partial list of Article I federal judicial appointments, excluding appointments to the District of Columbia judiciary.

The total number of Trump Article III judgeship nominees to be confirmed by the United States Senate was 234, including three associate justices of the Supreme Court of the United States, 54 judges for the United States courts of appeals, 174 judges for the United States district courts, and three judges for the United States Court of International Trade. Trump did not make any recess appointments to the federal courts. A record twelve circuit courts of appeals judges were confirmed during Trump's first year in office.

In terms of Article I courts, Trump made 26 appointments: 10 for the United States Court of Federal Claims, seven for the United States Tax Court, six for the United States Court of Appeals for Veterans Claims, two for the United States Court of Appeals for the Armed Forces, and one for the United States Court of Military Commission Review. Trump designated Susan G. Braden, Margaret M. Sweeney, and Eleni M. Roumel as chief judges of the Court of Federal Claims.

On the Article IV territorial courts, President Trump made one appointment.

United States Supreme Court

United States courts of appeals

United States district courts

United States Court of International Trade

Specialty courts (Article I)

United States Court of Federal Claims

United States Tax Court

United States Court of Appeals for Veterans Claims

United States Court of Appeals for the Armed Forces

United States Court of Military Commission Review

Territorial courts (Article IV)

See also 

 Donald Trump judicial appointment controversies
 Donald Trump Supreme Court candidates
 Federal Judicial Center
 Judicial appointment history for United States federal courts
 List of presidents of the United States by judicial appointments
 List of United States attorneys appointed by Donald Trump
 ABA ratings during the Trump administration
 Ratings of Article III and Article IV Judicial Nominees
 115th Congress (2017-2018)
 116th Congress (2019-2020)

Notes 
Courts

Renominations

Article III
Supreme Court

Votes

Courts of appeals

District courts

International Trade

Article I
Court of Federal Claims

Tax Court

Court of Appeals for Veterans Claims

Court of Appeals for the Armed Forces

Court of Military Commission Review

Article IV

References 

Trump
Judicial appointments
Lists of 21st-century people
Judges